The ZTE-G X760 Vegas is a discontinued GSM Dual-Band Digital touchscreen mobile phone. The cost of the Vegas was kept as low as possible by omitting some of the features found on high-end products, such as GPS, 3G or Wi-Fi. For example, in the UK, the Vegas was available for less than £40 from the Orange Shop on an Orange Pay As You Go contract.

The phone's memory is comparatively small at only 517KB, but is expandable up to 4GB with the use of a microSD card.

The phone was released in three colours: black, white, and pink. Its main feature is a 2.4-inch resistive touchscreen. It has a 1.3 MP Camera with MPEG-4 or H.263 video capture. There is support for video playback. The Vegas has an FM radio, an MP3 player and an internet browser. It also comes with one pre-installed game (named Magicsushi) which is a variant on the classic game Bejewelled, replacing jewels with sushi.

The phone comes complete with battery, charger, user guide, stereo headset and USB data cable.

Standby time is up to 7 days and talk time is up to 3 hours.

References

 Orange Vegas In Orange's Online Store

External links
ZTE Nubia N3 Price, Specification & Review

 
Vegas
Mobile phones introduced in 2009
X760